Prisoners at Wallingford Castle included the following: 
 Ealdred of Abingdon
 Edward I
 Richard, 1st Earl of Cornwall
 Maurice de Berkeley, 2nd Lord Berkeley
 Maurice de Berkeley
 Waleran de Beaumont
 Henry of Almain
 Walter Langton
 Robert de Ferrers
 Owen Tudor
 Henry Holland, 3rd Duke of Exeter
 Margaret of Anjou
 Charles of Orléans
 Sir Richard Browne, 1st Baronet, of London
 John Clotworthy
 David Jenkins (Royalist)

References

 Arn, M.J. (Ed.) (2000) Charles of Orléans in England (1415-1440), Brewer, Cambridge, MA, USA
 Beardwood, A. (1964) The trial of Walter Langton, Bishop of Lichfield, 1307-1312 American Philosophical Society.
 Crouch, D. (2008) The Beaumont Twins: The Roots and Branches of Power in the Twelfth Century. Cambridge University Press, Cambridge, UK.
 Ditchfield, P.H; Page, W. (Eds) (1907) Houses of Benedictine monks: The abbey of Abingdon In A History of the County of Berkshire: Volume 2 pp. 51–62. Accessed: 15 June 2011
 Great Britain Public Record Office (1650) Calendar Of State Papers, Domestic Series
 Hedges, J.K. (1881) The History of Wallingford, in the County of Berks. Wm Clowes, London, 2 vol.Hedges p 324 vol 1
 Hookham, M.A. (1872) The life and times of Margaret of Anjou, queen of England and France: and of her father René "the Good", king of Sicily, Naples, and Jerusalem. With memoirs of the houses of Anjou, Volume 2.  Tinsley Brothers
 Howell, T. B. (1816) A complete collection of state trials and proceedings for high treason and other crimes and misdemeanours from the earliest period to the year 1783. Volume 4. Hansard, London, UK.
 Lysons, D. ; Lysons. S (1813) Magna Britannia: Bedfordshire, Berkshire, and Buckinghamshire. Cadel & Davies, London, UK.
 Prestwich, M. (1988) Edward I. University of California Press, 1988, Berkeley, CA, USA.
 Richardson, D., Everingham, K.G. (2005) Magna Carta ancestry: a study in colonial and medieval families. Genealogical Publishing Company, Baltimore, Maryland, USA.
 Richardson, D., Everingham, K.G. (2004) Plantagenet Ancestry a study in colonial and medieval families. Genealogical Publishing Company, Baltimore, Maryland, USA.

External links 
Wallingford History Gateway
Royal Berkshire History: Wallingford Castle

Wallingford Castle